The Maine is an American rock band from Tempe, Arizona. Formed in 2007, the group consists of lead vocalist, guitarist and pianist John O'Callaghan, lead guitarist Jared Monaco, bass guitarist Garrett Nickelsen, drummer Patrick Kirch, and rhythm guitarist Kennedy Brock. The band is joined by touring member Adam Simons, as of 2018, who plays keys, rhythm and lead guitar as well as percussion.

Their first release, the Stay Up, Get Down extended play, was released in 2007, followed by the five-song EP, The Way We Talk, on December 11, 2007. The band's first full-length studio album, Can't Stop Won't Stop, was released July 8, 2008, while their second full-length album, Black & White, was released on July 13, 2010. Since then, the band has independently released six albums including Pioneer (2011), Forever Halloween (2013), American Candy (2015), Lovely Little Lonely (2017), You Are OK (2019), and XOXO: From Love and Anxiety in Real Time (2021).

History

Beginnings, Stay Up, Get Down and The Way We Talk (2006–2007)
Bassist Garrett Nickelsen and drummer Patrick Kirch had been playing in local bands together, and when one of them disbanded in 2006, they opted to start over with a new name and sound. Singer John O'Callaghan joined soon after auditions - with no prior vocal experience - along with guitarists Alex Ross and Ryan Osterman, officially forming The Maine in January 2007. Together, they released the EP Stay Up, Get Down. Months later Osterman left the band and was replaced by Kennedy Brock, and Alex Ross was replaced by Jared Monaco. The Maine signed to Fearless Records and on December 11, 2007, they debuted a five-song EP titled The Way We Talk, produced by Matt Grabe.

Can't Stop Won't Stop and ...And a Happy New Year (2008–2009)

The Maine's first full-length album, Can't Stop Won't Stop, was produced by Matt Squire and was released in the summer of 2008, just before the band toured with Good Charlotte, Boys Like Girls and Metro Station. In the fall of 2008, The Maine and We the Kings supported The Academy Is... on their tour in the United Kingdom.

The band's next release was a holiday EP in December 2008 titled ...And a Happy New Year, produced by Matt Grabe.  The EP included three new original tracks and a cover of the Wham! song "Last Christmas". In 2009, the band signed to Warner Bros. Records. In February 2009, The Maine and We the Kings headlined the 'Secret Valentine' tour, along with The Cab, VersaEmerge and There For Tomorrow. Furthermore, in July, the band performed on the Vans Warped Tour, a popular touring music festival.

Black and White (2009–2011)
On July 13, 2010, The Maine released its second full-length album, Black & White, produced by Howard Benson. In November 2010, while on the Harmony tour, The Maine and Never Shout Never had fans gather canned foods to help those in need. As a 'thank you' gift, both acts released a split EP titled Split - EP. On December 29, 2010, The Maine released the short film "In Darkness and in Light" on iTunes.

The band embarked on their first headlining tour in 2010, An Evening with The Maine.

In February 2011, The Maine set off on an international tour that began in the Philippines. From there, the members traveled to Australia and performed at Soundwave. They re-joined Never Shout Never for a European tour culminating in the U.K. In April 2011, the band co-headlined a U.S. tour with Augustana, lasting from early May to June 18, 2011. The band toured with Taking Back Sunday and Bad Rabbits in October 2011.

Pioneer (2011–2012)
In mid-2011, the band confirmed that they were working on a new album titled Pioneer. During this time, they had been playing 3 previously unreleased songs on tour and performed one live exclusively for Fuel TV, titled "Don't Give Up on "Us"".

The band announced via Facebook that it was to headline a tour in the fall of 2011 to promote Pioneer. The album was available to pre-order officially on November 1, 2011. On the band's Facebook page, the song Don't Give Up On Us was offered as a free download. In addition, the single Some Days was available for download on iTunes beginning November 15, 2011. The album was released on December 6, 2011, independently through Action Theory Records.

The band released a music video for "Misery" on February 16, 2012. Shortly after, the band also released a cover of The Beatles' hit "With A Little Help From My Friends" on Spotify. The song was recorded along with touring mates, American alternative band, Lydia and, Canadian indie-rock band, Arkells.

On September 11, 2012, The Maine re-released Pioneer as "Pioneer and The Good Love". The album, released via Rude Records, contains 6 previously unreleased tracks. They also released an EP version of the unreleased tracks under the name of “Good Love“.

Forever Halloween and Imaginary Numbers (2013–2014)
On April 12, 2013, the band announced that their fourth studio album Forever Halloween would be released on June 4, 2013. The album was released independently in the US in partnership with their management team 8123, via Universal Music in Canada, and Rude Records in Europe, UK, Australia and Japan. It sold over 10,000 copies in its first week, debuting at number 39 on the Billboard 200.

"Happy" was the first single of the album released on April 15, 2013, followed by a promotional single "Love and Drugs" which was released with a lyric video on May 6, 2013. A music video for the song "These Four Words" that premiered on YouTube and Vevo was released on the same day as the album. The single-shot video was directed by Daniel Gomes and the song is what frontman John O'Callaghan called the “most revealing song [he] has ever written”.

On November 5, 2013, The Maine announced online that they would be releasing a five-song acoustic EP titled Imaginary Numbers on December 12, 2013. The first song from the EP, "Raining in Paris" was released November 5 via YouTube with a lyric video. Imaginary Numbers was released on December 10, 2013.

The Maine later released a deluxe edition of Forever Halloween on June 17, 2014, containing five new tracks.

American Candy (2015–2016)
The band released their fifth studio album, American Candy, on March 31, 2015. The first single from the album, "English Girls", dropped February 11, 2015, with a debut at #17 on the iTunes Alternative Chart.
The second single from the album, "Miles Away" debuted at #16 on the iTunes Alternative Chart on March 10, 2015.
Verity Magazine infers, "Miles Away" is a more relaxed and laid back track, but nonetheless, you'll still want to get up and dance. The last song they released, "English Girls" was very upbeat and just spilling positive vibes, which is quite a stark contrast to their slower and darker previous album Forever Halloween. From the two tracks released so far, this album is sounding more like older albums from The Maine like Pioneer and Black and White".  "Same Suit, Different Tie" was released via SoundCloud the day before the album was set to release. In order to celebrate the release of the album, The Maine hosted "24 Hours of American Candy", where they live streamed their activities on the release day of American Candy.

The tour for this album took place in Spring 2015 with Real Friends and Knuckle Puck and The Technicolors. The band were also on the main stage for the entirety of the 2016 Vans Warped Tour, announcing that this would be their last tour before they headed into the studio to record their sixth studio album, scheduled for release in 2017.

The Maine released Covers (Side A) in December 2015, followed by Covers (Side B) in June 2016, each containing 3-4 covers of popular songs.

Lovely Little Lonely (2017–2018)

Lovely Little Lonely, was released on April 7, 2017. The first single from the album, "Bad Behavior", was released on January 19, 2017. The second single, "Black Butterflies and Deja Vu", was released on March 2, 2017. The Maine created and headlined the first 8123 Fest in honor of their 10-year anniversary. 8123 Fest was held in The Maine's hometown of Phoenix, Arizona at the Crescent Ballroom where 3,000 fans came together for the sold out festival.

Prior to the release of the album, The Maine announced their Lovely Little Lonely World Tour which would occur in 2017.

You Are OK (2018–2021)
On December 6, 2018, frontman John O’Callaghan tweeted that recording for their seventh album was complete. The title of the album, You Are OK, was announced on January 16, 2019, along with the release of the lead single, "Numb Without You". To celebrate the 10th anniversary of their first album Can't Stop Won't Stop, the band performed headlining sets on January 18 and 19, 2019, at their own music festival, 8123 Fest. At the same year, they created a new festival called Sad Summer Fest. Mayday Parade, We the Kings and Just Friends also performed at the festival. During the Summer of Sad Summer Fest, Pat Kirch and his soon-to-be wife announced that they were expecting their first born. After Sad Summer Fest, The Maine went on their own tour called The Mirror.

XOXO: From Love and Anxiety in Real Time (2021)
On March 15, 2021, the band announced the title of their eighth album, XOXO: From Love and Anxiety in Real Time, along with news that the lead single, "Sticky", would be released on Friday March 19, 2021. The album was released on July 9, 2021, the first day of Sad Summer Fest 2021. The band preceded the release of the album with additional singles "April 7th", "Lips", and "Pretender". To support the album, the band will be going on tour in the fall in support of All Time Low. In late 2021, they announced a headlining tour in the US called the "XOXO Tour" that would begin in 2022.

In 2022, the band released a single titled, "Loved You a Little" featuring Taking Back Sunday and Charlotte Sands. The song peaked at number eight on the Billboard Alternative Airplay chart and at number 14 on the Rock Airplay chart.

Musical style
The Maine's music style has generally been regarded as alternative rock, pop punk, pop rock, and emo. Magazine Alternative Press has referred to them as neon pop-punk.

Band members

Current members
 John O'Callaghan – lead vocals, piano (2007–present), rhythm guitar (2007–2009, 2014–present)
 Jared Monaco – lead guitar (2007–present)
 Garrett Nickelsen – bass (2007–present)
 Patrick Kirch – drums, percussion (2007–present)
 Kennedy Brock – rhythm guitar, backing vocals (2007–present), lead guitar (2007–2009, 2014–present)

Current touring members
 Adam Simons - keyboards, rhythm and lead guitar, percussion (2018–present)

Former members
 Ryan Osterman – lead guitar (2007)
 Alex Ross - rhythm guitar (2007)

Timeline

Discography

Studio albums
 Can't Stop Won't Stop (2008)
 Black & White (2010)
 Pioneer (2011)
 Forever Halloween (2013)
 American Candy (2015)
 Lovely Little Lonely (2017)
 You Are OK (2019)
 XOXO: From Love and Anxiety in Real Time (2021)

Other media
Aside from recording music, The Maine has other projects it undertakes for its fans. The band has released three books, This Is Real Life, Black & White Keepsake Book, and Roads. This Is Real Life  is composed of photos taken by the band's friend and photographer Dirk Mai, as well as journal entries written by the band members during the 2009 Vans Warped Tour. Black & White Keepsake Book consists of photos and journals from the band members. Roads contains behind-the-scenes photos that Dirk Mai has captured as well as pieces of writing from the band members. Later in 2010, lead singer John O'Callaghan collaborated with photographer Dirk Mai in the creation of Exaltation, a book containing 15 poems written by O'Callaghan complemented by nine accompanying photographs by Mai. John O'Callaghan released a book of poetry titled Sincerely, John The Ghost in 2016 to accompany his solo EP of the same name.

Tours

Headlining
 An Evening with The Maine (2010)
 The Maine Presents: Pioneer (2011)
 The Maine Presents: The Pioneer World Tour (2012)
 The 8123 Tour (2013)
 An Acoustic Evening with The Maine (2014)
 Farewell Forever Halloween (2014)
 The American Candy Spring Tour (2015)
 Free For All Tour (Summer-Fall 2015)
 The Maine Australian Tour (2015)
 An 8123 Holiday Tour (2015)
 The Lovely Little Lonely World Tour (2017)
 Modern Nostalgia Tour (2017)
 Fry Your Brain with The Maine (2018)
 The Mirror Tour (2019)
 The XOXO Tour (2022)

Co-Headlining
 Never Shout Never – The Harmony Tour (North American and European legs) (2010)
 Augustana – The Maine & Augustana (2011)
 Mayday Parade – The Maine & Mayday special guests The Postelles (2012)
 Anberlin – Anberlin & The Maine (2013)
 Mayday Parade – The American Lines Tour (North American and European legs) (2016)
 Mayday Parade & State Champs - Sad Summer Festival (2019)
Opening
 Soundtrack of Your Summer Tour (2008)
 The Compromising of Integrity, Morality and Principles in Exchange for Money Tour (2008)
 Taking Back Sunday 20th Anniversary Tour (2019)
 Sad Summer Festival (2021)

Awards and nominations

AP Magazine Readers' Awards
The Maine won Best Live Band 2010, Black & White won Album of the Year 2010, and its song Inside of You won Best Song 2010.

|-
|rowspan="3"| 2010
|style="text-align:left;"| Black & White
| Album of the Year
| 
|-
|style="text-align:left;"| "Inside of You"
| Best Song
| 
|-
|style="text-align:left;"| The Maine
| Best Live Band
|

Alternative Press Music Awards

|-
|rowspan="2"| 2016
|style="text-align:left;"| American Candy
| Album Of The Year
| 
|-
|style="text-align:left;"| The Maine
| Most Dedicated Fanbase
| 
|-
| 2017
|style="text-align:left;"| John O'Callaghan
| Best Vocalist
|

Arizona Ska Punk Awards

|-
|rowspan="3"| 2009
|style="text-align:left;"| The Maine
| Best Rock Band
| 
|-
|style="text-align:left;"| The Maine
| Best New Artist
| 
|-

|-
|rowspan="3"| 2010
|style="text-align:left;"| "Into Your Arms"
| Video of the Year
| 
|-
|style="text-align:left;"| "Santa Stole My Girlfriend"
| Song of the Year
| 
|-

Libby Awards

Rock Sound Awards

|-
| 2017
|style="text-align:left;"| The Maine
| Power Of Music Award
| 
|-
| 2019
|style="text-align:left;"| You Are OK
| Album Of The Year
|

References

External links
 

Fearless Records artists
Alternative rock groups from Arizona
American emo musical groups
American pop punk groups
American pop rock music groups
Musical quintets
Musical groups established in 2007
Musical groups from Tempe, Arizona
Warner Records artists
2007 establishments in Arizona